Harold Mather (24 January 1921 – 1 March 1999) was an English professional footballer who played as a full back.

References
 
 
 

1921 births
1999 deaths
Footballers from Bolton
Footballers from Burnley
English footballers
Association football defenders
Burnley F.C. players
Hull City A.F.C. players
Kettering Town F.C. managers
Accrington Stanley F.C. (1891) managers
Nelson F.C. players
Nelson F.C. managers
Ballymena United F.C. players
English football managers
FA Cup Final players